The Ladies' Repository was a monthly periodical based in Cincinnati and produced by members of the Methodist Episcopal Church. From 1841 to 1876, the magazine devoted itself to literature, arts and doctrines of Methodism, containing articles, poetry, fictions, engravings, and notes of interest to its readers.

Editors 
 1841 – 1844: Leonidas Lent Hamline
 1844 – 1846: Edward Thomson
 1846 – 1852: Benjamin Tefft
 1852 – 1853: William Clark Larrabee
 1853 – 1863: Davis Wasgatt Clark
 1864 – 1872: Isaac William Wiley
 1872 – 1876: Erastus Wentworth
 1876: Daniel Curry

See also 
 Early American Methodist Newspapers

External links 
 Browse Ladies' Repository by volume/issue
 American Views from Ladies' Repository

Visual arts magazines published in the United States
Monthly magazines published in the United States
Religious magazines published in the United States
Christian magazines
Defunct magazines published in the United States
History of Methodism in the United States
Magazines established in 1841
Magazines disestablished in 1876
Magazines published in Cincinnati